Scottish folklore (Scottish Gaelic: Beul-aithris na h-Alba) encompasses the folklore of the Scottish people from their earliest records until today. Folklorists, both academic and amateur, have published a variety of works focused specifically on the area over the years. Some creatures of Scottish folklore are Loch Ness Monster, brownies, bogles, kelpies, selkies, the wulver, the bean-nighe and the blue men of the Minch.

Notes

References

See also
Cornish mythology
English folklore
Matter of Britain
Welsh folklore
Welsh mythology
Scottish mythology

External links